Seaksarn Boonrat (born 1 April 1969) is a Thai sprinter. He competed in the men's 200 metres at the 1992 Summer Olympics.

References

1969 births
Living people
Athletes (track and field) at the 1992 Summer Olympics
Seaksarn Boonrat
Seaksarn Boonrat
Place of birth missing (living people)
Southeast Asian Games medalists in athletics
Seaksarn Boonrat